Lupus vulgaris (also known as tuberculosis luposa) are painful cutaneous tuberculosis skin lesions with nodular appearance, most often on the face around the nose, eyelids, lips, cheeks, ears and neck. It is the most common Mycobacterium tuberculosis skin infection. The lesions may ultimately develop into disfiguring skin ulcers if left untreated.

Signs and symptoms
It begins as painless reddish-brown nodules which slowly enlarge to form irregularly shaped red plaque.

Cause
Lupus vulgaris often develops due to inadequately treated pre-existing tuberculosis.  It may also develop at site of BCG vaccination. Rarely, it has been shown to be associated with tattoo marks.

Histopathology

Histologically, it shows presence of epithelioid cell granulomas with Langhans giant cells with or without central caseation necrosis in the dermis.

Diagnosis
On diascopy, it shows characteristic "apple-jelly" color. Biopsy will reveal tuberculoid granuloma with few bacilli. Mantoux test is positive.

Differential diagnosis
The condition should be distinguished from:
 Basal cell carcinoma
 Sarcoidosis
 Discoid lupus erythomatosus
 Leprosy
 Deep fungal infection

Management
A dermatologist or general physician usually administers combination therapy of drugs used for tuberculosis, such as Rifampicin, Isoniazid and Pyrazinamide (possibly with either streptomycin or ethambutol).

Prognosis
In longstanding scarred lesions, squamous cell carcinoma can develop.

History
In the 19th century, the chronic and progressive nature of this disease was particularly marked: it remained active for ten years, twenty years, or even longer and, proved resistant to all treatment until the breakthrough by Niels Ryberg Finsen using a form of "concentrated light radiation" now known as Photobiomodulation which won him a Nobel Prize.
Queen Alexandra of Great Britain, (1844–1925), consort to Edward the VII, as the inscription on the bronze statue of her at the London Hospital, notes, "Introduced to England the Finsen light cure for Lupus, and presented the first lamp to this hospital".

Etymology
The term "lupus" (meaning "wolf" in Latin) to describe an ulcerative skin disease dates to the late thirteenth century, though it was not until the mid-nineteenth that two specific skin diseases were classified as lupus erythematosus and lupus vulgaris. The term may derive from the rapacity and virulence of the disease; a 1590 work described it as "a malignant ulcer quickly consuming the neather parts; ... very hungry like unto a woolfe".

See also 
 Miliary tuberculosis
 Metastatic tuberculous abscess or ulceration
 List of cutaneous conditions

References

External links

 Image at University of Iowa (graphic)
 Image of lupus vulgaris, 1914 from Our Friend, the Sun: Images of Light Therapeutics from the Osler Library Collection, c. 1901-1944. Digital exhibition by the Osler Library of the History of Medicine, McGill University.

Tuberculosis
Mycobacterium-related cutaneous conditions